Chadsey may refer to:

People 
Charles Ernest Chadsey (1870–1930), American educator and school administrator
Geoffrey Chadsey (born 1967), American artist

Places
 Chadsey Lake, on Sumas Mountain 
Chadsey High School, a public secondary school in Detroit, Michigan